Samjiyŏn is a city in Ryanggang Province, North Korea.  It takes its name from three lakes in the city, which are collectively known as the Samjiyŏn. Samjiyŏn is situated near Mount Paektu, and tour groups fly to the city's airport to see the mountain, which holds significance in North Korean mythology.

Many houses and buildings in Samjiyŏn have been upgraded in recent decades, and many new buildings, including a recreational centre for youths, were finished in 2005. Popular activities in Samjiyŏn are skiing and various activities for schoolchildren, who use the surrounding area of Mt. Paektu for various scouting-like operations in conjunction with school-led vacations or outings.

In December 2019, Kim Jong-un opened a completed expansion of the existing township, described by state media as a "modern" city with residences and industrial parks. The city was known as a county until the decision of an upgraded its status in December 2019. The modernization of Samjiyon City is to also help boost tourism to North Korea (DPRK).

Administrative divisions
Samjiyŏn is divided into 10 dong (neighborhoods) and 6 ri (villages):

Transportation

Air

Samjiyŏn is served by the Korean People's Air Force along with the national flag carrier Air Koryo which operates scheduled flights and charter services between Samjiyŏn and P'yŏngyang, Wŏnsan and Ch'ŏngjin. In 2005, the airport was closed due to major renovations, which were partially underwritten by the Hyundai corporation.

Rail
Samjiyŏn city is served by the narrow-gauge Samjiyŏn Line of the Korean State Railway. Construction of a new,  standard-gauge line from the Pukbunaeryuk Line at Hyesan to Samjiyŏn is underway since 2008, with 80% of the roadbed and 70% of lineside structures being complete as of June 2015; the new terminus station is to be at Chunghŭng-ri, Samjiyŏn city.

Hyesan No.1/Wangdŏk Railway Station
The current presidential train station is located near Ŭihwa-ri in Poch'ŏn county, Ryanggang, in a very narrow gorge, making aerial attack difficult. The facilities of this station are much more sophisticated than the nearby civilian Hyesan Ch'ŏngnyŏn Station. Officially called Hyesan No.1 Railway Station, it is commonly known as Wangdŏk Station due to the original 1985 station having been built only  from Wangdŏk.

However, on inspecting the completed facilities, Kim Il-sung deemed it unsuitable, as it was in view of China's mountains. Ordering a third rebuild, the second station was taken over by the Samjiyŏn Precision Machinery Factory (the No. 95 Munitions Factory) after completion of the current, third site, in 1992. This third station is located directly on the Paektu Mountain Tourist Road, which gives direct access to Kim Il-sung's palace compound. 20 civilian personnel and two military squads protect the area immediately around the station. During the annual presidential visit in July or August, the entire civilian population is employed to clean the transportation system and local environment.

Tourism

The Samjiyon Grand Monument consists of four groups of sculptures called On the Battlefield, Fatherland, Longing, and Forwards.

Presidential palaces
Samjiyŏn has been a holiday resort and destination for two presidents of North Korea. Both Kim Il-sung and Kim Jong-il have established palaces and compounds in the area, accessed by a specially developed and exclusive railway station for the presidential train.

Climate 
Samjiyon has a subarctic climate transitioning into a humid continental climate (Köppen climate classification Dwc/Dwb) with cool summers and cold, dry winters.

Sport
It has one of the three speed skating ovals in the country.

See also

List of cities in North Korea
Geography of North Korea

References

External links

North Korea Uncovered , (North Korea Google Earth) a Google Earth map of most of Samjiyŏn's monuments, tourist facilities, and political residencies.
A collection of photos from in and around Samjiyon
Samjiyon County Changes Its Appearance picture album at Naenara

Counties of Ryanggang
Ski areas and resorts in North Korea